The Smurfs is an animated television series that originally aired on NBC from September 12, 1981 to December 2, 1989. Created by Pierre "Peyo" Culliford and based on his comic series of the same name, it was composed by 256 episodes with 417 stories, but also of three cliffhanger episodes and seven specials. The series was produced by Hanna-Barbera Productions with SEPP International S.A. and Lafig S.A. (on Seasons from 1 to 7 for the first and 8–9 for the second, respectively).

Series overview

Episodes

Specials

References

External links
 The Smurfs at Big Cartoon DataBase
 

Smurfs
Episodes